CITIC Construction is the construction and engineering subsidiary of the CITIC Group, a Chinese state owned conglomerate.  With US$2.73 billion in revenue in 2011, the company is ranked among the 100 largest construction companies in the world.

CITIC Construction in 2010 formed a consortium with zinc producer Baiyin Non-Ferrous Group to make an equity investment of $185 million in Oxus Gold, a gold miner with assets in Central Asia.   The financing deal gave the consortium a 59.7% stake in the company which had planned to use the funds to develop the Amantaytau Goldfields, an asset it held 50% of the ownership to in Uzbekistan. The goal at the time of the deal was to expand annual production at the Uzbek mine to 300,000 ounces.

On a two-day visit to Angola in 2012, Chang Zhenming head of the CITIC Group announced that the company was halfway through completing a plan to build 100,000 homes across 10 provinces in the country.

References

Construction and civil engineering companies of China
1960 establishments in China